The lance-nosed chameleon (Calumma gallus), also known as a blade chameleon, is endemic to eastern Madagascar.

Distribution and habitat
This chameleon is found in eastern Madagascar, in several areas including Ambavaniasy, Ampasimbe, Andekaleka, Betampona, Ile aux Prunes, Karianga, Lokomby, Mahanoro, Manombo, Vohidrazana and Zahamena.

References

gallus
Reptiles described in 1877
Taxa named by Albert Günther
Fauna of the Madagascar lowland forests